The 2017–18 season was Walsall's 130th season in their existence and their eleventh consecutive season in League One. Along with competing in League One, the club participated in the FA Cup, League Cup and EFL Trophy.

The season covers the period from 1 July 2017 to 30 June 2018.

Competitions

Friendlies

League One

League table

FA Cup

EFL Cup

EFL Trophy

Transfers

In

Out

Loan in

Loan out

Squad statistics
Source:

Numbers in parentheses denote appearances as substitute.
Players with squad numbers struck through and marked  left the club during the playing season.
Players with names in italics and marked * were on loan from another club for the whole of their season with Walsall.
Players listed with no appearances have been in the matchday squad but only as unused substitutes.
Key to positions: GK – Goalkeeper; DF – Defender; MF – Midfielder; FW – Forward

References

Walsall
Walsall F.C. seasons